The Coal Hole is a Grade II listed public house at 91 Strand, London.

It is part of the Savoy Court, itself an extension of the Savoy Hotel complex, and was built in 1903–04 by the architect T. E. Collcutt.

It has no connection with the old Coal Hole Tavern in Fountain Court (nos. 16 and 17) where the Wolf Club met and Renton Nicholson held his Judge and Jury shows. That tavern was renamed the Occidental and it collapsed in 1887 when Terry's Theatre was built nearby.

References

1904 establishments in England
Buildings and structures completed in 1904
Food and drink companies established in 1904
Grade II listed pubs in the City of Westminster
Strand, London